The Camú River (Spanish: Río Camú ) is  long river located in the northern Dominican Republic. It rises in Cordillera Central, flowing first north and then east past the city of Concepción de la Vega before reaching its mouth at the Yuna River near the city of Pimentel at the Duarte and Sánchez Ramírez province line.

References

Rivers of the Dominican Republic
La Vega, Dominican Republic